("wood flute") may refer to:

 Flue pipe, the widest scale of tubes producing notes on a pipe organ.
 Project Waldflöte, a 1900-era Gray & Davison organ adapted for MIDI control in Edinburgh